Porta Nuova may refer to:

Italy

Railway stations
Torino Porta Nuova railway station, the main railway station of Turin
Porta Nuova (Turin Metro), a rapid transit station
Pescara Porta Nuova railway station
Verona Porta Nuova railway station

City gates
Archi di Porta Nuova, Milan
Porta Nuova (Milan), a business district
Porta Nuova (Palermo)
Porta Nuova, in Caravaggio, Italy
Porta Nuova, in Grosseto
Porta Nuova, in Verona, designed by Michele Sanmicheli

See also
Portanova (disambiguation)